Neritina mesopotamica is a species of freshwater snail, a gastropod mollusk in the family Neritidae.

Distribution
Iran

Description

See also
 Neritina mesopotamica Mousson, 1874 is a synonym of Neripteron violaceum (Gmelin, 1791)

References

External links

Neritidae
Gastropods described in 1874